Teketo is a village in the municipality of Haskovo, in Haskovo Province, in southern Bulgaria.

This village once belonged to the Hasköylü Ağalık, (Agaluk of Haskovo)

References

Villages in Haskovo Province